Raquel Kops-Jones and Abigail Spears were the defending champions, but lost in the final to Chan Chin-wei and Xu Yifan, 5–7, 3–6.

Seeds

Draw

Draw

References
 Main Draw

2013 WTA Tour
2013 Doubles
2013 in South Korean tennis